LKT may refer to:

 LKT (musician) (born 1984), Nigerian recording artist, songwriter and performer
 Lakota language

See also 
 LKT Team Brandenburg, a German cycling team